Heliothis perstriata is a species of moth of the family Noctuidae. It has been recorded from Iran and Punjab in India.

Subspecies 
Heliothis perstriata perstriata
Heliothis perstriata fuscostriata (Iran)

References 

perstriata
Moths of Asia
Moths of the Middle East
Moths described in 1903